Joy Elizabeth Akther Crookes (born 9 October 1998) is a British singer-songwriter. She incorporates details about relationships, self-reliance, her culture, her South London roots, and her identity in her music. Crookes has released three extended plays since 2017 and was nominated for the Rising Star Award at the 2020 Brit Awards. Her debut studio album, Skin, was released in October 2021 to wide critical acclaim and reached the top five in the UK.

Early life 
Joy Elizabeth Akther Crookes was born in the Lambeth district of South London on 9 October 1998 to a Bangladeshi mother from Dhaka and an Irish father from Dublin. She grew up in Elephant and Castle where she spent eight years at a Catholic state primary school. Crookes attended the fee-paying Portland Place School in central London for secondary education. Crookes gained interest in singing after attending a jazz and blues workshop and, by the age of 13, had started publishing covers of Laura Marling and reggae to YouTube. Whilst a teenager Crookes taught herself how to play guitar, piano and bass, before writing her own music. When she was 14, her parents separated and she moved with her mother to Ladbroke Grove. In April 2013, Crookes uploaded a cover of "Hit the Road Jack" by Ray Charles to YouTube at the age of 14. The video gained the attention of over 600,000 viewers, notably including her current manager a few months later.

Career

2016–2017: Influence 
At the age of 17, Crookes released her debut single "New Manhattan" in February 2016, as well as "Sinatra" in August 2016, and "Bad Feeling" in June 2017. "New Manhattan" is a love song that was named after the area in Brussels. M Magazine wrote about Crookes at the start of her career, stating, "[She] may not be out of school yet, but what she lacks in experience she certainly makes up for in sonic dexterity." When describing the aesthetic in Crookes' debut music video for "Sinatra", Pip Williams from Line of Best Fit wrote, "much like [her] sound, [the video] blurs the classic with the contemporary, blanketing the listener in nostalgia whilst teasing them with hints of something brand new."

Crookes released her debut EP, Influence, with Speakerbox and Insanity Records in July 2017. The five-track EP lasts less than 20 minutes and features "Sinatra", "Bad Feeling", "New Manhattan", "Mother May I Sleep With Danger?" and "Power". Crookes performed "Mother May I Sleep With Danger?" along with her guitar player Charles J Monneraud on the global music platform, COLORS, in December 2017. As of November 2019, the video gained over eight million views on YouTube. She told BBC that she wrote the song by herself on New Year's Day of 2017 and began playing the song on tour, stating "When you tour a song you get to know it – you stay over at its house, you meet its mum, you get to know the sibling it doesn't like. So by the time we did Colors, it was a walk in the park. The video really changed everything. For about six months after that, everywhere I went people would say, 'Are you Joy from Colors?'"

2018–2019: Reminiscence and Perception 

Crookes released the single "Don't Let Me Down" with an accompanying music video in November 2018, before releasing her second EP, Reminiscence, in January 2019. Clare O'Shea from The Line of Best Fit described the EP as "a collection of five distinct tracks melding pop, R&B and soul." The EP features "Man's World", "Lover Don't", "Don't Let Me Down", "For a Minute" as well as the song "Two Nights", which was added to the BBC Radio 1 playlist in February 2019. Crookes made her first appearance in Vogue in March 2019, before releasing the singles "Since I Left You": "a hauntingly stripped back break-up song," as well as  "London Mine" in April 2019. "The song celebrates the invisible people and how London belongs to no one but everyone," Crookes told The Line of Best Fit about "London Mine". "It's a celebration of immigrants who make up this country."

Crookes performed on the Introducing Stage at BBC Radio 1's Big Weekend in May 2019, before releasing her third EP, Perception in June 2019. The five-track EP features "Hurts", "No Hands", "London Mine", "Since I Left You", and "Darkest Hour". Crookes made her first Glastonbury Festival appearance in June 2019. In September 2019, Crookes self-produced released "Yah / Element" a medley of "Yah" and "Element" by Kendrick Lamar, before announcing her sold-out headlining tour of Europe for October 2019. She released the single "Early" with Irish hip-hop artist Jafaris in early October, which later went on to reach No. 1 on the UK Asian chart. Crookes made her debut television appearance when she performed "Early" with Jafaris on Later... with Jools Holland in November 2019. Crookes made an appearance on the Irish music TV series Other Voices in November 2019. Crookes was shortlisted for Rising Star Award at the 2020 Brit Awards. She was placed fourth in Sound of 2020, an annual BBC poll of 170 music critics who predict breakthrough acts for the coming year. Crookes was praised her for her "South London stories filled with wit and romance".

2020–present: Skin 
In April 2020, Crookes released her first single of 2020, "Anyone But Me", which debuted atop the UK Asian Top 40. The song is about her battles with mental health and how she feels that "there's another person living in [her] head." In September 2020, Crookes released a cover version of The Wannadies' 1994 single "You & Me Song", which was featured in an O2 TV advertisement, consequently entering both the UK Singles Downloads and the UK Singles Sales charts. Crookes released the single "Feet Don't Fail Me Now" in June 2021, which became her third single to top the UK Asian Top 40 and is featured on the EASports video game FIFA 22 It served as the lead single from her debut album, Skin, which she revealed alongside the release of its title track in August 2021. Its third single, "When You Were Mine", was released later that month and became her fourth single to top the UK Asian Top 40. "Trouble" was released as the fourth single a few days before the release of Skin on 15 October 2021.

On the album, Crookes incorporates samples on songs like "19th Floor" and "Kingdom". In an interview with Sound of Boston, Crookes explains the origins of both samples, and why she chose to include them: "The opening of 19th Floor is my grandma saying goodbye to me as she usually does when I leave her flat on the 19th floor of her block in south London. The voice call in Kingdom is my dad talking about the importance of punk music. I included these to contextualize my life at the time and where those songs were born from. I am a super family-orientated person and it felt like an important part of my narrative to include them on the album."

Personal life and artistry 
Crookes had the name of her Irish grandfather, Frankie Crookes, tattooed on her arm before he died in 2018.

Crookes has cited Black Uhuru, Marvin Gaye, The Pogues, Sinéad O'Connor, Kendrick Lamar, Gregory Isaacs, and Kate Nash as some of the names incorporated with her first experiences with music. She told BBC about the music she was exposed to whilst driving with her father to her Irish dancing lessons, "My dad wanted to give me a real education. From Nick Cave to King Tubby to all this Pakistani music. He'd say, 'This is from your ends of the world, you should hear this.'"

Discography

Studio albums

Extended plays

Singles

Awards and nominations

References

External links
  – official site
 
 

1998 births
Living people
English people of Bangladeshi descent
English people of Irish descent
English soul singers
English rhythm and blues singers
Neo soul singers
People from Elephant and Castle
People from Lambeth
Singers from London
English women guitarists
English guitarists
21st-century women guitarists
21st-century English women singers
21st-century English singers